Timyra floccula is a moth in the family Lecithoceridae. It was described by John David Bradley in 1965 and is found in Uganda.

References

Moths described in 1965
Timyra